Keno Marley Machado (born 13 July 2000) is a Brazilian boxer. He competed in the men's light heavyweight event at the 2020 Summer Olympics.

References

External links
 

2000 births
Living people
Brazilian male boxers
Olympic boxers of Brazil
Boxers at the 2020 Summer Olympics
Boxers at the 2018 Summer Youth Olympics
Sportspeople from Bahia
Pan American Games medalists in boxing
Medalists at the 2019 Pan American Games
Pan American Games silver medalists for Brazil
21st-century Brazilian people